Abu 'l-Gharaniq Muhammad II ibn Ahmad (died 875) was the eighth Emir of Ifriqiya from 864 to 875.

He succeeded his uncle Ziyadat Allah II (863–864), inheriting from his predecessors a stable and prosperous state. An aesthete fond of wine and hunting, he felt able to devote himself to extravagance and displays of pomp. His reign saw the conquest of Malta, the siege of Salerno and continuous raids into mainland Italy, forcing Pope John VIII to pay tribute.

Towards the end of his reign a caravan of pilgrims from Mecca introduced the plague into Ifriqiya – this, and an ensuing famine led to severe depopulation and the weakening of the emirate.

Al-Mufawwid was thus nominally responsible for Ifriqiya, Egypt, Syria, the Jazira and Mosul, Armenia, Mihrajanqadhaq and Hulwan, with Musa ibn Bugha as his deputy. Nevertheless, it was al-Muwaffaq (his uncle) who held the actual power in the state.

Muhammad was succeeded by his brother Abu Ishaq Ibrahim II (875–902).

References

Sources
 
 

875 deaths
Year of birth unknown
Aghlabid emirs of Ifriqiya